"Roman Catholic" is sometimes used to differentiate members of the Catholic Church in full communion with the pope in Rome from other Christians who also self-identify as "Catholic". It is also sometimes used to differentiate adherents to the Latin Church and its use of the Roman Rite from Catholics of the Eastern Catholic Churches. It is not the official name preferred by the Holy See or bishops in full communion with the pope as a designation for their faith or institution.

"Catholic" is one of the Four Marks of the Church set out in the Nicene Creed, a statement of belief widely accepted across Christian denominations. Catholics, Eastern Orthodox, and Oriental Orthodox consider the term to refer to a single institutional one true church, while Protestant ecclesiology considers it to refer to a church invisible referred to as the Christian Church.

Following the pejorative term "papist", attested in English since 1528, the terms "Popish Catholic" and "Romish Catholic" came into use during the Protestant Reformation. From the 17th century, "Roman Catholic Church" has been used as a synonym for the Catholic Church by some Anglicans and other Protestants in English-speaking countries.

Formulations such as the "Holy Roman Church" or the "Roman Catholic Church" have occurred by officials of the Catholic Church before and after the Reformation.  While it typically refers to the Diocese of Rome, such as in Cardinal of the Holy Roman Church, it has also occurred in the context of ecumenical dialogue with dialogue partners preferring this usage. The first known occurrence of "Roman Catholic" as a synonym for "Catholic Church" was in communication with the Armenian Apostolic Church in 1208, after the East–West Schism. The last official magisterial document to use "Roman Catholic Church" was issued by Pope Pius XII in 1950.

The term "Catholic Church" is officially used by the Holy See. It is applied in the Catechism of the Catholic Church (1990), the Code of Canon Law (1983), in the documents of the Second Vatican Council (1962–1965), the First Vatican Council (1869–1870) and the Council of Trent (1545–1563), and numerous other official documents. "Catholic Church" and "Catholic(s)" is also broadly reflected in most English-language academia and media.

History of the term

16th and 17th centuries

The terms "Romish Catholic" and "Roman Catholic", along with "Popish Catholic", were brought into use in the English language chiefly by adherents of the Church of England.

The reign of Elizabeth I of England at the end of the 16th century was marked by conflicts in Ireland. Those opposed to English rule forged alliances with those against the Protestant Reformation, making the term "Roman Catholic" almost synonymous with being Irish during that period, although that usage changed significantly over time.

Like the term "Anglican", the term "Roman Catholic" came into widespread use in the English language only in the 17th century. The terms "Romish Catholic" and "Roman Catholic" were both used in the 17th century and "Roman Catholic" was used in some official documents, such as those relating to the Spanish Match in the 1620s. There was, however, significant tension between Anglicans and Roman Catholics at the time (as reflected in the Test Act for public office). Even today, the Act of Settlement 1701 prohibits Roman Catholics from becoming English monarchs.

18th and 19th centuries

The official and popular uses of the term "Roman Catholic" in the English language grew in the 18th century. A letter by John Wesley, one of the founders of Methodism, published in 1749 is addressed to "a Roman Catholick". Up to the reign of George III, Catholics in Britain who recognized the Pope as head of the Church had generally been designated in official documents as "Papists". In 1792, however, this phraseology was changed and, in the Speech from the Throne, the term "Roman Catholic" was used.

By the early 19th century, the term "Roman Catholic" had become well established in the English-speaking world. As the movement that led to Catholic Emancipation through the Roman Catholic Relief Act of 1829 grew, many Anglicans and Protestants generally began to accept that being a Roman Catholic was not synonymous with being disloyal to the British Crown. While believing that in the past the term Roman Catholic may have been synonymous with rebel, they held that it was by then as indicative of loyalty as membership in any other Christian denomination. The situation had been very different two centuries before, when Pope Paul V forbade English members of his church from taking an oath of allegiance to King James I, a prohibition that not all of them observed.

Also in the 19th century, some prominent Anglican theologians, such as William Palmer and John Keble, supported the Branch Theory, which viewed the universal Church as having three principal branches: Anglican, Roman and Eastern. The 1824 issue of The Christian Observer defined the term Roman Catholic as a member of the "Roman Branch of the Church". By 1828, speeches in the British Parliament routinely used the term Roman Catholic and referred to the "Holy Roman Catholic and Apostolic Church".

In the United States, use of the term "Roman Catholic", as well as the number of Catholics, began to grow only in the early 19th century. Like the term "papist", "Romanist" was often used as a mainly pejorative term for Roman Catholics at the time. In 1790, there were only 100 Catholics in New York and some 30,000 in the whole country, with only 29 priests. As the number of Catholics in the United States grew rapidly from 150,000 to 1.7 million between 1815 and 1850, mostly by way of immigration from Ireland and the German Confederation, many clergy followed to serve that population, and Roman Catholic parishes were established. The terms "Roman Catholic" and "Holy Roman Catholic" thus gained widespread use in the United States in the 19th century, both in popular usage and in official documents. In 1866, US President Andrew Johnson attended a meeting of the Council of the Roman Catholic Church.

Branch theory

There is sometimes controversy about the name "Roman Catholic Church" when it is used by members of other churches to suggest that the church in full communion with Rome is only one part of the One, Holy, Catholic and Apostolic Church. That argument is linked especially with the branch theory upheld by many Anglicans that the church in communion with the Pope is only one branch of a divided Catholic Church, of which the Eastern Orthodox Church and Anglicanism are the other two principal branches.

In 1864, the Holy Office rejected the branch theory and affirmed in a letter written to the English bishops that the Roman Church is not just a part of the Catholic Church and stating that "there is no other Catholic Church except that which is built on the one man, Peter". In 1870, English bishops attending the First Vatican Council raised objections to the expression Sancta Romana Catholica Ecclesia ("Holy Roman Catholic Church"), which appeared in the schema (the draft) of the council's Dogmatic Constitution on the Catholic Faith. The bishops proposed for the word "Roman" to be omitted or at least for commas to be inserted between the adjectives out of concern that use of the term "Roman Catholic" would lend support to proponents of the branch theory. While the council overwhelmingly rejected that proposal, the text was finally modified to read "Sancta Catholica Apostolica Romana Ecclesia" translated into English either as "the holy Catholic Apostolic Roman Church" or, by separating each adjective, as "the holy, catholic, apostolic and Roman Church".

From 1937 to 1972, the Constitution of Ireland recognised the "special position of the Holy Catholic Apostolic and Roman Church". The Anglican Archbishop of Dublin had objected to "Catholic Church" and quoted the Council of Trent for the longer title, which was approved by Eugenio Pacelli and Pope Pius XI. The same name is used in a 2009 Irish law.

20th century
American Catholics, who by the year 1900 were 12 million people and had a predominantly Irish clergy, objected to what they considered the reproachful terms Popish and Romish and preferred the term Roman Catholic.

In the early 20th century, the use of "Roman Catholic" continued to spread in the United States and Canada to refer to individuals, parishes, and their schools. For instance, the 1915 Report of the Commissioner of Education of the United States had a specific section for "Roman Catholic Parish Schools". By 1918, legal proceedings in state supreme courts (from Delaware to Minnesota) and laws passed in the State of New York used the term "Roman Catholic parish".

Current usage

"Roman Catholic" is generally used on its own to refer to individuals, and in compound forms to refer to worship, parishes, festivals, etc. Its usage has varied, depending on circumstances. It is sometimes also identified with one or other of the terms "Catholic", "Western Catholic" (equivalent to "Latin Catholic"), and "Roman-Rite Catholic".

The terms "Catholic Church" and "Roman Catholic Church" are names for the entire church that describes itself as "governed by the successor of Saint Peter and by the bishops in communion with him." In its formal documents and pronouncements the church most often refers to itself as the "Catholic Church" or simply "the Church" (written in documents with a capital "C"). In its relations with other churches, it frequently uses the name "Roman Catholic Church", which it also uses internally, though less frequently. Some writers, such as Kenneth Whitehead and Patrick Madrid, argue that the only proper name for the church is "the Catholic Church".  Whitehead, for example, states that "The term Roman Catholic is not used by the Church herself; it is a relatively modern term, and one, moreover, that is confined largely to the English language. The English-speaking bishops at the First Vatican Council in 1870, in fact, conducted a vigorous and successful campaign to insure that the term Roman Catholic was nowhere included in any of the Council's official documents about the Church herself, and the term was not included."

The name "Roman Catholic Church" is occasionally used by popes, bishops, other clergy and laity, who do not see it as opprobrious or having the suggested overtone. The use of "Roman", "Holy", and "Apostolic" are accepted by the Church as descriptive names. At the time of the 16th-century Reformation, the Church itself "claimed the word catholic as its title over Protestant or Reformed churches". It believes that it is the one, holy, catholic, and apostolic Church.

Throughout the years, in various instances, official church documents have used both the terms "Catholic Church" and "Roman Catholic Church" to refer to the worldwide church as a whole, including Eastern Catholics, as when Pope Pius XII taught in Humani generis that "the Mystical Body of Christ and the Roman Catholic Church are one and the same thing." However, some Eastern Christians, though in communion with the Bishop of Rome, apply the adjective "Roman" to the Latin or Western Church alone. Representatives of the Catholic Church are at times required to use the term "Roman Catholic Church" in certain dialogues, especially in the ecumenical milieu, since some other Christians consider their own churches to also be authentically Catholic.

In the 21st century, the three terms – "Catholic Church", "Roman Catholic Church" and "Holy Roman Catholic Church" – continue to appear in various books and other publications. Scholarly debate on the proper form of reference to the Catholic Church within specific contexts continues. For instance, the Catechism of the Catholic Church does not contain the term "Roman Catholic Church", referring to the church only by names such as "Catholic Church" (as in its title).

"Roman Catholic" and "Catholic"
"In popular usage, 'Catholic' usually means 'Roman Catholic'," a usage opposed by some, including some Protestants. "Catholic" usually refers to members of any of the 24 constituent Churches, the one Western and the 23 Eastern. The same meaning is attributed also to "Roman Catholic" in older documents of the Holy See, talks by Popes and in newspapers.

Although K. D. Whitehead has claimed that "the term Roman Catholic is not used by the Church herself" and that "the proper name of the Church, then, is 'the Catholic Church', never 'the Christian Church'," official documents such as Divini Illius Magistri, Humani generis, a declaration of 23 November 2006 and another of 30 November 2006, while not calling the Church "the Christian Church", do use "Roman Catholic" to speak of it as a whole without distinguishing one part from the rest. But ecclesiologists such as Joseph Ratzinger and Walter Kasper argue that the term "Roman Catholic" should not be used to denote the entire Catholic Church.

When used in a broader sense, the term "Catholic" is distinguished from "Roman Catholic", which has connotations of allegiance to the Bishop of Rome, i.e. the Pope. When thus used, "Catholic" also refers to many other Christians, especially Eastern Orthodox and Anglicans, but also to others, including Old Catholics and members of various Independent Catholic denominations, who consider themselves to be within the "catholic" tradition. They describe themselves as "Catholic", but not "Roman Catholic" and not under the authority of the Pope. Similarly, Henry Mills Alden writes:  According to this viewpoint, "For those who 'belong to the Church,' the term Methodist Catholic, or Presbyterian Catholic, or Baptist Catholic, is as proper as the term Roman Catholic. It simply means that body of Christian believers over the world who agree in their religious views, and accept the same ecclesiastical forms."

"Roman Catholic" and "Western" or "Latin Catholic"
The Holy See has at times applied the term "Roman Catholic" to refer to the entirety of the church that is in full communion with it, encompassing both its Eastern and Western elements. For examples of statements by Popes that employ the term "Roman Catholic" in this way, see Papal references below. This is the only meaning given to the term "Roman Catholic" at that official level. However, some do use the term "Roman Catholic" to refer to Western (i.e. Latin) Catholics, excluding Eastern Catholics. An example is the statement in the book When other Christians become Catholic: "the individual becomes Eastern Catholic, not Roman Catholic".

Similarly the Catholic Faith Handbook for Youth states that "not all Catholics are Roman Catholics and there are other Catholic Churches", using the term "Roman Catholic" to refer to Western Church members alone. The same distinction is made by some writers belonging to Eastern Catholic churches. That this view is not the only one, not alone at the level of the Holy See and in reference books such as John Hardon's Modern Catholic Dictionary, but also at a popular level, is shown by the use of terms such as "Byzantine Roman Catholic" and "Maronite Roman Catholic" as self-identification by individuals or as the name of a church building. Additionally, in other languages, the usage varies significantly.

Many, even Catholics, are unaware or only dimly aware that the Catholic Church has Western and Eastern branches. This is partly because, outside the Middle East, Africa, and India, Eastern Catholics are a small fraction of the total number of Catholics.

The last known magisterial use of "Roman Catholic Church" was Pope Pius XII in Humani generis who taught that "the Mystical Body of Christ and the Roman Catholic Church are one and the same thing". The Second Vatican Council would take a more nuanced view of this issue (Lumen gentium, 7–8).

Further, Adrian Fortescue noted in his article in the 1910 Catholic Encyclopedia the distinction between "Roman Church" and "Church of Rome". He said that the expression "Church of Rome" commonly applied by non-Catholics to the Catholic Church but, according to him, it can only be used correctly to refer the Diocese of Rome; and the term "Roman Church", in case of the patriarchate, can be used as equivalent to "Latin Church": "A German Catholic is not, strictly speaking, a member of the Church of Rome but of the Church of Cologne, or Munich-Freising, or whatever it may be, in union with and under the obedience of the Roman Church (although, no doubt, by a further extension Roman Church may be used as equivalent to Latin Church for the patriarchate)."

"Roman Catholic" and "Roman Rite Catholic"

When referring to worship, the term Roman Catholic is at times used to refer to the "Roman Rite", which is not a church but a form of liturgy. The Roman Rite is distinct from the liturgies of the Eastern Catholic Churches and also from other Western liturgical rites such as the Ambrosian Rite, which have a much smaller following than the Roman Rite.

An example of this usage is provided in the book Roman Catholic Worship: Trent to today states:
We use the term Roman Catholic Worship throughout to make it clear that we are not covering all forms of Catholic worship. There are a number of Eastern Rite churches that can justly claim the title Catholic, but many of the statements we make do not apply to them at all.

Compared to the Roman Rite, the other Western liturgical rites have little following. Hence, the Vatican department that deals with forms of worship (including music) in the Western Church often issues documents that deal only with the Roman Rite. Any involvement by the Holy See in questions of Eastern liturgies is handled by the Congregation for the Oriental Churches.

Some of the writers who draw a contrast between "Roman Catholics" and "Eastern Catholics" may perhaps be distinguishing Eastern Catholics not from Latin or Western Catholics in general, but only from those (the majority of Latin Catholics) who use the Roman liturgical rite. Adrian Fortescue explicitly made this distinction, saying that, just as "Armenian Catholic" is used to mean a Catholic who uses the Armenian rite, "Roman Catholic" could be used to mean a Catholic who uses the Roman Rite. In this sense, he said, an Ambrosian Catholic, though a member of the Latin or Western Church, is not a "Roman" Catholic. He admitted, however, that this usage is uncommon.

Parishes and dioceses

When the term "Roman Catholic" is used as part of the name of a parish it usually indicates that it is a Western parish that follows the Roman Rite in its liturgy, rather than, for instance, the less common Ambrosian Rite, e.g. St. Dominic Roman Catholic Church, Oyster Bay, New York. The shorter term "Catholic" may also appear in parish names and "Roman Catholic" sometimes even appears in the compound name of Eastern Catholic parishes, e.g. St. Anthony Maronite Roman Catholic Church.

All Catholic parishes are part of an ecclesiastical jurisdiction, usually a diocese (called an eparchy in the canon law of the Eastern Catholic Churches). These jurisdictions are usually grouped in ecclesiastical provinces, headed by a metropolitan archdiocese. All dioceses and similar jurisdictions—Eastern and Western—come under the authority of the Pope. The term "Roman Catholic archdiocese" is formally used to refer to both Western and Eastern Churches. As of January 2009, there were 630 Roman Catholic archdioceses, Western and Eastern.

Second Vatican Council
The Second Vatican Council did not use the term "Roman Catholic Church", and in one important passage of the dogmatic constitution Lumen gentium replaced it with an equivalent phrase, "the Catholic Church, which is governed by the successor of Peter and by the bishops in union with that successor," while also giving in a footnote a reference to two earlier documents in which the word "Roman" was used explicitly.

Karl Rahner, a prominent theologian at the Second Vatican Council, argued that by the 1960s the Church had made two major transitions of identity: the first had been from Jewish to Western-Gentile and a second from a Western church to a global church. With Vatican II's decision to allow the liturgy in the vernacular, even aspects of the Roman Rite everything would not be "Roman" anymore. Fifty years after Vatican II, one third of the Catholic church's 1.2 billion members lived in the Western world. With large contingent of the hierarchy, clergy, and laity from the non-Western world had led to further distancing from the term "Roman' within Catholic circles.

The two earlier documents that the council stated had applied the phrase "Roman Church" to the Church itself, the church "governed by the successor of Saint Peter and by the bishops in communion with him," were the Tridentine Profession of Faith and the First Vatican Council's dogmatic constitution on faith. As far back as 1208 the adjective "Roman" was applied to the Church "outside which we believe that no one is saved." Considerable change in this doctrine on salvation is reflected by 1965 in the conciliar Declaration on Religious Freedom of the Second Vatican Council.

In cases of dialogue with the churches and ecclesial communities of the west, however, who are in dialogue specifically with the Latin Church from which they derive, the term Roman Catholic is ambiguous whether it refers to the Latin Church specifically, or the entire Catholic communion, as in the dialogue with Archbishop of Canterbury Donald Coggan on 29 April 1977,

Other examples include occasional, minor addresses or lectures, usually written by minor curial staff.  Pope John Paul II referred to himself as "the Head of the Roman Catholic Church" (29 September 1979). He called the Church "Roman Catholic" when speaking to the Jewish community in Mainz on 17 November 1980, in a message to those celebrating the 450th anniversary of the Confessio Augustana on 25 June 1980, when speaking to the people of Mechelen, Belgium on 18 May 1985, when talking to representatives of Christian confessions in Copenhagen, Denmark on 7 June 1989, when addressing a delegation from the Ecumenical Patriarchate of Constantinople on 29 June 1989, at a meeting of the Ukrainian Synod in Rome on 24 March 1980, at a prayer meeting in the Orthodox cathedral of Bialystok, Poland on 5 June 1991, when speaking to the Polish Ecumenical Council in Holy Trinity Church, Warsaw 9 June 1991, at an ecumenical meeting in the Aula Magna of the Colégio Catarinense, in Florianópolis, Brazil on 18 October 1991, and at the Angelus in São Salvador da Bahia, Brazil on 20 October 1991.

Pope Benedict XVI called the Church "the Roman Catholic Church" at a meeting in Warsaw on 25 May 2006 and in joint declarations that he signed with Archbishop of Canterbury Rowan Williams on 23 November 2006 and with Patriarch Bartholomew I of Constantinople on 30 November 2006.

These exceptions prove the rule, however. The total usage by popes of "Catholic Church" rather than "Roman Catholic" is a factor of 10:1, according to the Holy See's website, and there is zero usage as such in official documents of papal magisterium in the last 66 years.

Catechism of the Catholic Church
The Baltimore Catechism, the official catechism authorized by the Catholic bishops of the United States between 1885 and 1965, stated: "That is why we are called Roman Catholics; to show that we are united to the real successor of St. Peter" (Question 118), and refers to the Church as the "Roman Catholic Church" under Questions 114 and 131. 

Usage of the name "Roman Catholic Church" has not appeared in the Catechism of the Catholic Church since 1992.

View of Eastern Catholics
Some Eastern Catholics, while maintaining that they are in union with the Bishop of Rome, reject the description of themselves as being "Roman Catholics". Others, however, have historically referred to themselves as "Roman Catholics" and "Roman Catholic" sometimes appears in the compound name of Eastern Catholic parish churches, e.g. St. Anthony's Maronite Roman Catholic Church. Academic usage of "Roman Catholic" to describe Eastern Catholic bodies and persons is also extant.

Orthodox Christians sometimes use the term "Uniate" (occasionally spelled "Uniat") to describe the Eastern Catholic churches which were previously Eastern or Oriental Orthodox, although some consider this term derogatory. Official Catholic documents no longer use the term, due to its perceived negative overtones. In fact, according to John Erickson of Saint Vladimir's Orthodox Theological Seminary, "The term 'uniate' itself, once used with pride in the Roman communion, had long since come to be considered as pejorative. 'Eastern Rite Catholic' also was no longer in vogue because it might suggest that the Catholics in question differed from Latins only in the externals of worship. The Second Vatican Council affirmed rather that Eastern Catholics constituted churches, whose vocation was to provide a bridge to the separated churches of the East."

See also

Catholic Church

Notes

References

Further reading

Church statistics
 
 
 
 
 
 
 
 

  Arguably these [Eastern Catholic] Churches are Roman Catholic [...]; however, they are not referred to as such in common parlance [...] The Latin Church [...] is also correctly referred to as the Roman Catholic Church.
 this relatively small community is now divided into three religious groups: Roman Catholic, Greek Catholic, and Orthodox.
 

Note: Romanian, Greek, and Ukrainian statistics may be translations that reflect the usage of "Roman Catholic" in the original languages, and may not necessarily reflect the prevailing use of the term among native English speakers.

External links
 Roman Catholic, Catholic Encyclopedia

Catholicism
Catholic terminology
Latin Church